Washington is a city in, and the county seat of, Washington County, Kansas, United States.  As of the 2020 census, the population of the city was 1,071.

History
Washington was established in spring 1860, and in the same year named county seat. Until the end of the American Civil War it was protected by two stockaded buildings, the Washington Company House and Woolbert's Stockade Hotel.

The first post office in Washington was established in November 1861.

Geography
Washington is  (39.816877, -97.052503).

Demographics

2010 census
As of the census of 2010, there were 1,131 people, 512 households, and 311 families living in the city. The racial makeup of the city was 97.8% White, 0.3% African American, 0.1% Native American, 0.2% Asian, 0.4% from other races, and 1.2% from two or more races. Hispanic or Latino of any race were 2.3% of the population.

There were 512 households, of which 26.0% had children under the age of 18 living with them, 52.3% were married couples living together, 6.1% had a female householder with no husband present, 2.3% had a male householder with no wife present, and 39.3% were non-families. 36.7% of all households were made up of individuals, and 18.9% had someone living alone who was 65 years of age or older. The average household size was 2.13 and the average family size was 2.76.

The median age in the city was 46.8 years. 21.8% of residents were under the age of 18; 4.7% were between the ages of 18 and 24; 20.9% were from 25 to 44; 26.7% were from 45 to 64; and 25.9% were 65 years of age or older. The gender makeup of the city was 47.1% male and 52.9% female.

2000 census
As of the census of 2000, there were 1,223 people, 553 households, and 331 families living in the city. The racial makeup of the city was 98.94% White, 0.08% African American, 0.25% Native American, 0.25% from other races, and 0.49% from two or more races. Hispanic or Latino of any race were 0.57% of the population.   
   
There were 553 households, out of which 24.1% had children under the age of 18 living with them, 51.9% were married couples living together, 5.2% had a female householder with no husband present, and 40.1% were non-families. 37.1% of all households were made up of individuals, and 19.7% had someone living alone who was 65 years of age or older. The average household size was 2.13 and the average family size was 2.81.

In the city, the population was spread out, with 21.1% under the age of 18, 4.9% from 18 to 24, 23.1% from 25 to 44, 23.0% from 45 to 64, and 28.0% who were 65 years of age or older. The median age was 46 years. For every 100 females, there were 89.0 males. For every 100 females age 18 and over, there were 84.9 males.

The median income for a household in the city was $30,529, and the median income for a family was $37,448. Males had a median income of $27,171 versus $17,938 for females. The per capita income for the city was $15,760. About 8.6% of families and 10.5% of the population were below the poverty line, including 13.1% of those under age 18 and 15.5% of those age 65 or over.

Education
The community is served by Washington County USD 108 public school district, which formed in 2006 by the consolidation of North Central USD 221 and Washington USD 222.

Notable people
 Charlie Becker (1887–1968), actor who portrayed the mayor of Munchkinland in 1939 The Wizard of Oz film
 Bill Pannbacker, former member of the Kansas House of Representatives

See also
 Central Branch Union Pacific Railroad

References

Further reading

External links

 City of Washington
 Washington - Directory of Public Officials
 Washington city map, KDOT

Cities in Washington County, Kansas
Cities in Kansas
County seats in Kansas
1860 establishments in Kansas Territory